Jérôme-Joseph de Momigny (20 January 1762 – 25 August 1842) was a Belgian/French composer and music-theorist.

Life
Momigny was born in Philippeville, Belgium. He composed music and wrote books including Momigny, which he printed himself.

His theories about rhythm and musical phrasing were ahead of his time. From 1803 to 1806, he published his most notorious work Cours complet d'harmonie et de composition, d'après une théorie neuve et générale de la musique (in three volumes). It features, among others, a new theory about the significance of the upbeat over the downbeat, which was later taken up by Hugo Riemann.

He died in the Charenton asylum.

Publications
Writings in music
 Cours complet d'harmonie et de composition d'après une théorie neuve et générale de la musique, 3 vols (1806)
 Exposé succinct du seul système musical qui soit vraiment fondé et complet, lu à la classe des beaux-arts de l'Institut, le 17 décembre 1808 (1808)
 Réponse aux observations de M. Morel, ou à ses attaques contre la seule vraie théorie de la musique, n. d.
Political writings
 De l'ordre et du désordre, et de l'ordre du jour (1825)
 De la monarchie selon elle-même et selon Dieu et le bon sens, essai dédié aux puissances paternelles, seules amies de l'humanité, seules conformes à la raison (1826)
 À MM. les députés des départemens (1828)
 À Louis-Philippe, roi des Français, de l'ordre et du désordre dans les êtres et les choses (1831)
 La Grande nouvelle humanitaire (1837)
 À la France de la monarchie et du bon ordre (n. d.)

Bibliography
 Albert Palm: Jérôme-Joseph de Momigny: Leben und Werk. Ein Beitrag zur Geschichte der Musiktheorie im 19. Jahrhundert (Köln: Arno Volk Verlag, 1969)
 Jacques Chailley: Un grand théoricien belge méconnu de la musique: J.-J. de Momigny (Brussels, 1966)
 Glenn Gerald Caldwell: Harmonic Tonality in the Music Theories of Jerome-Joseph Momigny, 1762–1842 (Studies in the History and Interpretation of Music, vol. 79) (2001)

External links
 

1762 births
1842 deaths
19th-century French musicologists
Belgian classical composers
Belgian male musicians
Belgian music theorists
French Romantic composers
Male composers
People from Philippeville
Walloon people
19th-century Belgian male musicians